Tetrabenzylzirconium is an organozirconium compound with the formula Zr(CH2C6H5)4.  The molecule features diamagnetic Zr(IV) bonded to four benzyl ligands. It is an orange air- and photo-sensitive solid, which is soluble in hydrocarbon solvents. The compound is a precursor to catalysts for the polymerization of olefins.

Structure, synthesis, reactions

X-ray crystallography demonstrates that the benzyl ligands are highly flexible: one polymorph features four η2-ligands, whereas another has two η1- and two η2-benzyl ligands.

The compound is prepared by combining benzylmagnesium chloride and zirconium tetrachloride in diethyl ether.  

Tetrabenzylzirconium readily undergoes protonolysis, e.g. with hydrogen chloride:
Zr(CH2C6H5)4  +  HCl  →   Zr(CH2C6H5)3Cl  +  CH3C6H5

See also
Tetrabenzyltitanium (RN = 17520-19-3)

References

Organozirconium compounds
Benzyl compounds
Zirconium(IV) compounds